Mats Paulson (born Maths Paul Ingemar Paulsson; 28 January 1938 – 19 September 2021) was a Swedish singer, poet, songwriter, and painter. He released his first disc in 1964; Tango i Hagalund. He wrote hundreds of songs, among them Barfotavisan, Baggenslåten and Visa vid vindens ängar. He worked together with artists, among them Alexander Rybak and Håkan Hellström.

References

External links

 
 

1938 births
2021 deaths
Swedish male singers
Swedish poets
Swedish male writers
Swedish composers
Swedish male composers
20th-century Swedish painters
Swedish male painters
21st-century Swedish painters
Swedish male poets
People from Linköping
20th-century Swedish male artists
21st-century Swedish male artists